Lata Bhagwan Kare is a 2020 Indian Marathi biographical film directed by Naveen Deshaboina. The film is based on the life of Lata Bhagwan Kare, who participated in a marathon at the age of 65 for her husband's medical treatment. It received the National Film Award – Special Mention at the 67th National Film Awards.

The lead role of Lata was played by Lata Kare herself.

Plot
The film is based on 60-year old woman, who suffers from financial crisis and won a marathon to earn money for the treatment of her husband, who suffers from serious disease.

Music
The film has two songs: Neela Thujala and Jayache Kshitija which are composed by Prashant Mahamuni. The lyrics of the songs are also penned by Prashant.

Reception
Rishabh Deb writing for The Times of India gave 2.5 rating out of 5, and noted that the story of Lata Bhagwan Kare comes through "quite effectively on the silver screen". He further added that "several scenes in the film will have a long-lasting impact on the audience. Since the characters are real, the impact becomes stronger. The struggle, pain and instances from Lata's life are so real that one doesn't mind minor glitches in dubbing and cinematography. Surprisingly, Lata and all other cast have done a convincing job playing and re-living the same emotions on the screen. The film will have a deep impact on the audience and it is a must-watch for those who want to know about the inspiring woman Lata Bhagwan Kare".

Awards and accolades

References

External links
 

2020 films
2020 biographical drama films
Indian biographical films
2020s Marathi-language films
Biographical films about sportspeople
Films set in India